Paulo Reichardt (born 8 August 1960) is a Paraguayan sports shooter. He competed in the men's double trap event at the 2016 Summer Olympics.

References

External links
 

1960 births
Living people
Paraguayan male sport shooters
Olympic shooters of Paraguay
Shooters at the 2016 Summer Olympics
Place of birth missing (living people)
Shooters at the 2015 Pan American Games
Pan American Games competitors for Paraguay